The 1960–61 international cricket season was from September 1960 to April 1961.

Season overview

September

Pakistan in Ceylon

December

Pakistan in India

West Indies in Australia

February

MCC in New Zealand

March

India in Ceylon

References

International cricket competitions by season
1960 in cricket
1961 in cricket